The Folies Bergère is a cabaret music hall, located in Paris, France. Located at 32 Rue Richer in the 9th Arrondissement, the Folies Bergère was built as an opera house by the architect Plumeret. It opened on 2 May 1869 as the Folies Trévise, with light entertainment including operettas, comic opera, popular songs, and gymnastics. It became the Folies Bergère on 13 September 1872, named after nearby Rue Bergère. The house was at the height of its fame and popularity from the 1890s' Belle Époque through the 1920s.

Revues featured extravagant costumes, sets and effects, and often nude women. In 1926, Josephine Baker, an African-American expatriate singer, dancer and entertainer, caused a sensation at the Folies Bergère by dancing in a costume consisting of a skirt made of a string of artificial bananas and little else.

The institution is still in business, and is still a strong symbol of French and Parisian life.

History

Located at 32 Rue Richer in the 9th Arrondissement, the Folies Bergère was built as an opera house by the architect Plumeret. The métro stations are Cadet and Grands Boulevards.

It opened on 2 May 1869 as the Folies Trévise, with light entertainment including operettas, opéra comique (comic opera), popular songs, and gymnastics. It became the Folies Bergère on 13 September 1872, named after a nearby street, Rue Bergère ("bergère" means "shepherdess").

In 1882, Édouard Manet painted his well-known painting A Bar at the Folies-Bergère which depicts a bar-girl, one of the demimondaines, standing before a mirror.

In 1886, Édouard Marchand conceived a new genre of entertainment for the Folies Bergère: the music-hall revue. Women would be the heart of Marchand's concept for the Folies. In the early 1890s, the American dancer Loie Fuller starred at the Folies Bergère. In 1902, illness forced Marchand to leave after 16 years.

In 1918,  (1880–1966) made his mark on the revue. His revues featured extravagant costumes, sets and effects, and "small nude women". Derval's small nude women would become the hallmark of the Folies. During his 48 years at the Folies, he launched the careers of many French stars including Maurice Chevalier, Mistinguett, Josephine Baker, Fernandel and many others. In 1926, Josephine Baker, an African-American ex-patriate singer, dancer and entertainer, caused a sensation at the Folies Bergère in a new revue, La Folie du Jour, in which she danced a number Fatou wearing a costume consisting of a skirt made of a string of artificial bananas and little else. Her erotic dancing and near-nude performances were renowned. The Folies Bergère catered to popular taste. Shows featured elaborate costumes; the women's were frequently revealing, practically leaving them naked, and shows often contained a good deal of nudity. Shows also played up the "exoticness" of people and objects from other cultures, obliging the Parisian fascination with the négritude of the 1920s.

In 1926 the facade of the theatre was given a complete make-over by the artist . The facade was redone in Art Deco style, one of the many Parisian theatres of this period using the style.

In 1936, Derval brought Josephine Baker from New York City to lead the revue En Super Folies. , a young Hungarian arrived from Balassagyarmat, his hometown, designed the poster for En Super Folies, a show starring Josephine Baker in 1936. This began a long love story between Michel Gyarmathy, Paris, the Folies Bergère and the public of the whole world which lasted 56 years. The funeral of Paul Derval was held on 20 May 1966. He was 86 and had reigned supreme over the most celebrated music hall in the world. His wife Antonia, supported by Michel Gyarmathy, succeeded him. In August 1974, the Folies Antonia Derval passed on the direction of the business to Hélène Martini, the empress of the night (25 years earlier she had been a showgirl in the revues). This new mistress of the house reverted to the original concept to maintain the continued existence of the last music hall which remained faithful to the tradition.

Since 2006, the Folies Bergère has presented some musical productions with Stage Entertainment like Cabaret (2006–2008) or Zorro (2009–2010).

Performers 

Charles Aznavour
Louisa Baïleche, dancer and singer
Josephine Baker
Pierre Boulez
Aimée Campton
Cantinflas
Charlie Chaplin
Maurice Chevalier
Chocolat, clown
Dalida
Norma Duval, Spanish actress and star
Fernandel
W. C. Fields
Ella Fitzgerald
George Foottit, clown
Eugénie Fougère
Loie Fuller
Jean Gabin
Georges Guetary
Grock, clown
Suzy van Hall
Johnny Hallyday
Benny Hill
Zizi Jeanmaire
Elton John
Margaret Kelly Leibovici, founder of the Bluebell Girls
Valérie Lemercier
Claudine Longet
Jean Marais
Marcel Marceau
Cléo de Mérode
Miss La La
Mistinguett
Gilbert Montagne
Yves Montand
Liliane Montevecchi
Kara, Gentleman Juggler
Musidora
Nala Damajanti, snake charmer 
La Belle Otero
Patachou
Édith Piaf
Liane de Pougy
Yvonne Printemps
Raimu
Régine
Line Renaud
Ginger Rogers
Frank Sinatra
Little Tich
Charles Trenet
Odette Valery
Sylvie Vartan
Gregory Bellini 
Ry X

Filmography 
 1935: Folies Bergère de Paris directed by Roy Del Ruth, with Maurice Chevalier, Merle Oberon, and Ann Sothern
 1935: Folies Bergère de Paris directed by Marcel Achard with Maurice Chevalier, Natalie Paley, Fernand Ledoux. A French-language version of the 1935 Hollywood film.
 1956: Folies-Bergère directed by Henri Decoin with Eddie Constantine, Zizi Jeanmaire, Yves Robert, Pierre Mondy
 1956: Énigme aux Folies Bergère directed by Jean Mitry with Dora Doll, Claude Godard
 1991: La Totale! directed by Claude Zidi with Thierry Lhermitte

Similar venues
The Folies Bergère inspired the Ziegfeld Follies in the United States and other similar shows, including a long-standing revue, the Las Vegas Folies Bergere, at the Tropicana Resort & Casino in Las Vegas and the Teatro Follies in Mexico.

In the 1930s and '40s the impresario Clifford C. Fischer staged several Folies Bergere productions in the United States. These included the Folies Bergère of 1939 at the Broadway Theater in New York and the Folies Bergère of 1944 at the Winterland Ballroom in San Francisco.

The Las Vegas Folies Bergere, which opened in 1959, closed at the end of March 2009 after nearly 50 years in operation.

A recent example is Faceboyz Folliez, a monthly burlesque and variety show at the Bowery Poetry Club in New York City.

In popular culture
 In Richard Connell's 1924 short story "The Most Dangerous Game", General Zaroff "hummed a snatch of song from the 'Folies Bergere'" when referring to the pack of dogs he released to patrol the grounds every night.
 In the 1927 winner of the Academy Award for Best Picture, "Wings", Mary (Clara Bow) follows Jack (Buddy Rogers) into the Folies Bergère and dresses up as a dancer.
 It is the setting for the 1934 ballet Bar aux Folies-Bergère with choreography by Ninette de Valois to music by Chabrier.
 In the 1954 film The Last Time I Saw Paris, when a man innocently looks at a baby right after her bath, her grandfather covers the baby's body with a towel and tells the man (her uncle-in-law) that this is not the Folies-Bergère.
 In the 1960s, British science fiction TV series Captain Scarlet and the Mysterons episode "Model Spy", Colonel White remarks that Cloudbase is an operational base and not the Folies Bergère.
 In the 1960s, British science fiction TV series Thunderbirds episode "The Perils of Penelope" Alan Tracy expresses disappointment at not being able to accompany his brothers to "The Folies".  Lady Penelope tells him he is too young.
 In the beginning of Episode 2.20 of the crime drama series Vega$ "The Golden Gate Cop Killer: Part 1" an advertisement for Foiles Bergere can be seen several times on the Tropicana's sign as various characters pull up to the front and exit their vehicles.
 In the 1982 musical Nine, the character of Liliane La Fleur sings a song titled "Folies Bergère" in homage to the Folies Bergère and similar musical acts.
 In the 1984 musical Sunday in the Park with George, George promises to take Dot to the Follies.
 In the 1990s, British comedy series Knowing Me Knowing You with Alan Partridge, fictional TV chat show host Alan Partridge's guests and co-presenter attend the Folies Bergere on the evening before the show's live broadcast from Paris. The show's Band Leader, Glen Ponder, is sacked by Partridge live on air for not inviting him on the trip.
It is mentioned in the Walt Disney's Enchanted Tiki Room attraction at Disneyland in Anaheim, California by the character "Fritz".
 It is mentioned in Allan Sherman’s song "You Went the Wrong Way, Old King Louie."

See also
 Absinthe
 Cabaret Red Light
 Casino de Paris
 Crazy Horse (cabaret)
 Jubilee!
 Le Lido
 Moulin Rouge
 Paradis Latin
 Peepshow
 Sirens of TI
 Tropicana Club

Notes

External links

Folies Bergère official site

Cabarets in Paris
Music halls in Paris
Entertainment venues in Paris
Theatres in Paris
Buildings and structures in the 9th arrondissement of Paris
Art Deco architecture in France
Belle Époque